Stenospermation is a genus of plant in family Araceae native to South America and Central America.

Species
Some species classified under the genus are the following:

Stenospermation adsimile Sodiro - Ecuador, Peru, Bolivia
Stenospermation ammiticum G.S.Bunting - Venezuela, Guyana
Stenospermation amomifolium (Poepp.) Schott - Venezuela, Colombia, Ecuador, Peru
Stenospermation ancuashii Croat - Peru
Stenospermation andreanum Engl. - Panama, Colombia, Ecuador
Stenospermation angosturense Engl. - Colombia, Ecuador
Stenospermation angustifolium Hemsl. - Costa Rica, Nicaragua, Honduras, Panama, Colombia, Ecuador, Peru
 Stenospermation arborescens Madison - Ecuador
Stenospermation archeri K.Krause - Colombia
Stenospermation benavidesae Croat - Colombia
 Stenospermation brachypodum Sodiro - Ecuador
Stenospermation crassifolium Engl. - Peru
Stenospermation densiovulatum Engl. - Ecuador
Stenospermation dictyoneurum Croat & Acebey - Bolivia
Stenospermation ellipticum Croat & D.C.Bay - Valle del Cauca in Colombia
Stenospermation escobariae Croat & D.C.Bay - Valle del Cauca in Colombia
 Stenospermation flavescens Engl. - Ecuador
Stenospermation flavum Croat & D.C.Bay - Valle del Cauca in Colombia
Stenospermation gentryi Croat - Colombia
Stenospermation glaucophyllum Croat & D.C.Bay - Valle del Cauca in Colombia
 Stenospermation gracile Sodiro - Ecuador, Peru
 Stenospermation hilligii Sodiro - Ecuador
 Stenospermation interruptum Sodiro - Ecuador
Stenospermation laevis Croat - Colombia
Stenospermation latifolium  Engl. - Ecuador
Stenospermation longifolium Engl. - Ecuador, Colombia
Stenospermation longipetiolatum Engl. - Ecuador
Stenospermation longispadix Croat - Colombia
Stenospermation maguirei A.M.E.Jonker & Jonker - Guyana, Suriname
 Stenospermation majus Grayum - Costa Rica
Stenospermation marantifolium Hemsl. - Costa Rica, Nicaragua, Panama
Stenospermation mathewsii Schott - Ecuador, Peru, Bolivia
Stenospermation monsalvae Croat & D.C.Bay - Valle del Cauca in Colombia
Stenospermation multiovulatum (Engl.) N.E.Br. - Guatemala, Ecuador, Colombia, Venezuela, Peru, the Guianas, northwestern Brazil
Stenospermation nebulense G.S.Bunting - Amazonas State in southern Venezuela
Stenospermation olgae Croat- Colombia
Stenospermation parvum Croat & A.Gomez - Ecuador
 Stenospermation peripense Sodiro - Ecuador
Stenospermation pittieri Steyerm - Táchira State in western Venezuela
Stenospermation popayanense Schott - Ecuador, Colombia
Stenospermation pteropus Grayum - Costa Rica
Stenospermation robustum Engl. - Costa Rica, Panama, Colombia, Peru
Stenospermation rusbyi N.E.Br. - Ecuador, Bolivia
Stenospermation sessile Engl. - Costa Rica, Panama
Stenospermation spruceanum Schott - Guatemala, Costa Rica, Panama, Colombia, Venezuela, Peru, the Guianas, northwestern Brazil
 Stenospermation subellipticum Sodiro - Ecuador
Stenospermation ulei K.Krause - Venezuela, Guyana, northwestern Brazil
Stenospermation velutinum Croat & D.C.Bay - Valle del Cauca in Colombia
 Stenospermation wallisii Mast. - Ecuador, Colombia, Peru
Stenospermation zeacarpium Madison - Ecuador, Huánuco region of Peru

References

 
Araceae genera
Taxonomy articles created by Polbot